Joseph Lewis Morphis (April 17, 1831 – July 29, 1913) was a U.S. Representative from Mississippi.

Born near Pocahontas, McNairy County, Tennessee, Morphis pursued elementary studies.

He engaged in planting. He served as a member of the Mississippi House of Representatives in 1859. He entered the Confederate States Army as captain in August 1861 and served until the close of the Civil War.
He moved with his family to Pontotoc, Mississippi, in 1863.

He served as a member of the State constitutional convention in 1865.
He served as a member of the State house of representatives 1866-1868.
Upon the readmission of the State of Mississippi to representation was elected as a Republican to the Forty-first and Forty-second Congresses and served from February 23, 1870, to March 3, 1873.
He was an unsuccessful candidate for renomination in 1872.
He was appointed by President Rutherford Hayes as United States Marshal of the Northern District of Mississippi and served from 1877 to 1885.
Licensed as an Indian trader on the Osage Reservation in 1890 and engaged in that occupation until 1901. He lived in retirement until his death in Cleveland, Oklahoma, July 29, 1913. He was interred in Woodland Cemetery.

References

1831 births
1913 deaths
People from McNairy County, Tennessee
Confederate States Army officers
United States Marshals
Republican Party members of the Mississippi House of Representatives
Republican Party members of the United States House of Representatives from Mississippi
19th-century American politicians